Daniel McLaren may refer to:

 Dan Rice (1823–1900), American entertainer, born Daniel McLaren
 Danny McLaren (1870–?), Scottish footballer